Glycopyrronium tosylate, sold under the brand name Qbrexza among others, is a medication used for the treatment of primary axillary hyperhidrosis.

It was approved for medical use in the United States in June 2018, and in Japan in January 2022.

References

External links 
 

Muscarinic antagonists